Roses & Clover is the second Brushfire Records release by Animal Liberation Orchestra.

Track listing

Personnel
Animal Liberation Orchestra
Steve Adams – bass, vocals, production
Dave Brogan – drums, percussion, piano, wurlitzer, synthesizer, vocals, production
Zach Gill – piano, rhodes piano, synthesizer, guitar on track 5, ukulele, vocals, vox mutator, production
Dan Lebowitz – guitar, lap steel guitar, vocals, production

Additional Personnel
Evan Francis – alto saxophone on track 3
Adam Theis – trombone on track 3
Jenna Lebowitz – vocals on tracks 3 and 9
Amy Windecker – vocals on track 9
Muneca Osorio – vocals on track 9
Dave Simon-Baker – production, recording
Robert Carranza – production, mixing, mastering

Chart performance

References

2007 albums
Animal Liberation Orchestra albums